The Robotech Role-Playing Game, based on the Robotech and Robotech II: The Sentinels series, was originally published by Palladium Books from 1986 to 1995 (and reprinted until 1998). A second series based on Robotech: The Shadow Chronicles was released between 2008-2018.

First edition (1986–1998)

Titles
The Robotech RPG sourcebooks
 Book One: Macross (November 1986)
 Book Two: Robotech Defense Force Manual (March 1987)
 Book Three: Zentraedi (March 1987)
 Book Four: Southern Cross (September 1987)
 Book Five: Invid Invasion (June 1988)
 Book Six: The Return of the Masters (July 1989)
 Book Seven: New World Order (April 1995)
 Book Eight: Strike Force (July 1995)

The Robotech RPG adventure books
Ghost Ship (February 1988)
Robotech Defense Force Accelerated Training Program (March 1988)
Lancer's Rockers (December 1989)
Zentraedi Breakout (May 1994)

Robotech II: The RPG
The Sentinels (September 1987)
Robotech Expeditionary Force Field Guide (March 1989)

Books one through five covered the three segments of Robotech as aired. The initial five volumes were written by Kevin Siembieda.

Books seven, eight, and all but one of the adventure books took place during or shortly after the Macross segment. The two "Robotech II" books also took place after Macross.

Book six and Lancer's Rockers took place after the series ended.

Other Palladium regulars and freelance authors contributed to the later sourcebooks and adventure books. Illustrations consisted of line art taken from original Japanese source material in addition to new black-and-white line art done by Palladium artists such as Kevin Long.

Palladium also published Macross II: The Role-Playing Game, a separate RPG based on the Macross II anime, but this was entirely unrelated to the Robotech continuity.

Storyline
The original Robotech RPG by and large followed the TV series storyline, attempting in its own way to fill in gaps just as the novelizations by Jack McKinney did. Several of the sourcebooks covered different parts of the world during or shortly after the Macross era, where there was the most room for expansion. However, the RPG diverged from the McKinney stories after the events covered in the Robotech series ended. Where McKinney followed Scott Bernard and the others in their search for Admiral Rick Hunter, leaving behind a peaceful planet earth, Palladium posited the Invid returning to earth a few months after they were driven away.

The books Return of the Masters and Lancer's Rockers were set during this second Invid invasion, and introduced concepts and events not suggested by the original material. Return of the Masters, set in Asia, features a system of gladiatorial mecha martial arts combat called Mecha Su-Dai. Lancer's Rockers concerns a network of travelling performers following in the footsteps of New Generation rock star Lancer/Yellow Dancer, carrying protoculture-powered musical instruments that double as powerful weapons (reminiscent of, but unrelated to, similar developments in the Macross sequel Macross 7).

The Sentinels RPG also diverged in some respects from the story covered in the Sentinels novels and comic books, having been developed independently based on the same incomplete source material provided by Harmony Gold. The two primary differences are the idea that the SDF-3 left with an entire fleet of REF ships accompanying them, and that the REF and the Sentinels joined in a protracted war against the Invid Regent.  The game also suggested that members of the Sentinels' races would openly join the REF.

Game system

The Robotech RPG used a modified version of the rule system used in the Palladium Fantasy Role-Playing Game introduced several years earlier. Clearly patterned after Dungeons & Dragons, the Palladium Fantasy RPG used a very similar rule system based around physical and mental statistics generated by rolling 3D6 (three six-sided dice), and the use of a D20 (20-sided die) in combat. Percentile dice (two ten-sided dice, one read as a tens column and the other as a ones column) are used for skill resolution. The Robotech RPG introduced the concept of mega-damage—"super" hit-points that are equivalent to 100 ordinary-person hit points—to simulate the toughness of the heavily armored mecha. This concept would become widely used in Palladium's Rifts game.

Inaccuracies
The creators of the Robotech RPG originally lacked access to the complete source material, working against deadlines based on what could be seen from show footage and limited-scope translations. As a result of incomplete availability, compounded by animation and dubbing errors, some descriptions of mecha and weapon systems given in the First-Edition books are inconsistent with either the animation or subsequently uncovered source material.  The confusion is particularly strong in Southern Cross, where the many humanoid robots, battloids, and suits of armor are often confused for one another.  These inaccuracies are genuine errors and distinct from creative choices that Palladium writers made to elaborate on the Robotech storyline as discussed previously.

Cancellation
Contractual issues in the wake of Harmony Gold's aborted Robotech 3000 project, as well as a general refocusing of the company on production of its flagship Rifts line, caused Palladium to forgo renewing the Robotech license. The Robotech RPG line went out of print as of June 30, 2001.

Second edition (2008–2018)
In 2007 Palladium reacquired the Robotech license, coinciding with the DVD release of the animated feature film Robotech: The Shadow Chronicles. The game was released under the new title Robotech: The Shadow Chronicles Role-Playing Game.

Palladium's license for the game expired on March 31, 2018, and is not being renewed.

Robotech RPG Tactics (2013-2018) 

On April 18, 2013, Palladium Books initiated a Kickstarter campaign to raise $70,000 needed to develop a new miniature wargaming system called Robotech RPG Tactics. The campaign raised $1,442,312 from 5,342 backers by its close on May 20, 2013. The funded game was scheduled to ship in December 2013, but was eventually delayed.

As of September 2014 the game had begun to be shipped, with Wave 1 shipping expected to continue throughout the fall.

Partial delivery of the Kickstarter rewards had been in progress since 3Q 2014 through 1Q 2015.  Despite all claims and given the history so far of Palladium Books regarding delivery dates, there had been no real evidence shown of any progress on the rest of the miniatures and no clue on a time frame as noted starting in the updates to the project from 30 Jan 2014 as the entire "Wave 1" line was put through preproduction starting after the delivery date was missed.    No pictures of the "Wave 2" products were ever shown.

What was delivered so far was substandard in quality compared to even low end wargame miniatures manufacturers.  This was noted by multiple miniature wargaming sites and model builders, such as talkwargaming, theminaturespage forums (where use of scale model rather than game miniature manufacturing processes was noted), and deltavector, whose summary reads:

As noted in the sample references above and simple comparisons to miniatures from Games Workshop , Zvezda , Battlefront (Flames of War), Wargames Factory , Hawk Wargames  and many others revealed that RRPGT miniatures were less detailed, with glaring errors in manufacturing requiring additional work by customers to correct  (seams highly visible in the middle of supposedly flat areas), extremely high piece counts comparable to much larger vehicle miniatures by other miniature manufacturers (Space Marine Terminators have six or so, Space Marines have eight or so, while none of the RRPGT minis were in single figures and many were closer to 20+ pieces) and the lack of simple industry standard basics like clear acrylic flight stands for flying units (see references to multiple miniature companies above).  Also, possibility out of the box was limited since many square peg & slot connections were used rather than round ones, which required yet further customer modification of the base miniatures to gain something other than a few different clones of each miniature, all available in the Kickstarter updates referenced above.

On 28 February 2018 it was announced that the Robotech® RPG Tactics Wave Two rewards would not be realised, and that Palladium's license has expired and is not being renewed.

Strange Machine Games
After Palladium lost the license, it was picked up by Strange Machine Games, who published a new version of the Robotech RPG. The first volume was released in December, 2019. On November 2, 2021 Strange Machine Games Finished funding of their second book, Robotech: Homefront. The book will feature the second and third seasons of Robotech, The Masters Saga and New Generations.

Robotech: A Macross Saga Role Playing Game

References

External links 
Robotech role-playing games official discussion board at Palladium Books Forums of the Megaverse
The Robotech Role-Playing Game at RPG Geek Database
Robotech: The Shadow Chronicles at RPG Geek Database
Robotech role-playing games at RPGnet Game Index
 Robotech Bibliography - Listings of RPG books in and out of print.
Product page

Robotech games
Megaverse (Palladium Books)
Mecha role-playing games
Role-playing games based on anime and manga
Role-playing games introduced in 1986

ja:ロボテック#ロールプレイング・ゲーム本